Kathryn Hill (born 21 June 1994) is a Scottish footballer who currently plays as a defender for Rangers in the Scottish Women's Premier League.

Career
Hill started her career playing with Rangers and was with the Glasgow club for five years. She then moved to Old Dominion University for two seasons. She captained the team in her final year. In 2017, she moved to Durham, England, in the FA Women's Championship. In 2022, she returned to Rangers and was named team captain.

International career
On 6 March 2012, Hill made her International debut against Sweden in a 0-0 draw with Sweden winning the match on penalties, in the Ten Nation La Manga Under-19 Cup, she was also in the team that defeated France 4-0 in the same competition. She played 2 games a 2-4 defeat against Italy and a 1-0 win against Russia, in the 2012 UEFA Women’s Under-19 Championship Second Qualifying Round. She played in all three of the 2013 UEFA Women’s Under-19 Championship First Qualifying Round, with Two wins against Belarus 8-0 and Turkey 0-2 was followed by a 0-1 defeat by Norway. In March 2013 Scotland again played in the Women’s U-19 Tournament at La Manga, Hill played in 3 games, A 2-1 victory against England was followed by 4-4 draw with Norway and a 3-7 win against Italy. Hill then was part of the team that competed in the 2013 UEFA Women’s Under-19 Championship Second Qualifying Round defeating Austria 0-4, she scored against Ukraine in a 4-2 win and in the last match game lost 1-0 to Denmark.

Honours

Club
Rangers
 City of Glasgow Woman's Cup: 2022
 Scottish Women's Premier League Cup: 2022

References

 

1994 births
Living people
Women's association football defenders
Scottish women's footballers
Rangers W.F.C. players
Footballers from North Ayrshire
Durham W.F.C. players
Old Dominion Monarchs women's soccer players
People from Dalry, North Ayrshire
Scottish expatriate women's footballers
Scottish expatriate sportspeople in the United States
Expatriate women's soccer players in the United States